Ballymoreen may refer to:
Ballymoreen (civil parish)
Ballymoreen (townland), one of the seven townlands in the above parish
Ballymurreen (electoral division)